The Methodist Church of Alberton, located at 802 Railroad St. in Alberton, Montana, was built in 1912.  It was listed on the National Register of Historic Places in 1997.

It is a one-story gable-front church.  It was deemed notable as "This simple wood frame church building exhibits the design and construction characteristics typical of historic churches of the Methodist denomination in Montana."

References

National Register of Historic Places in Mineral County, Montana
Churches completed in 1912
Methodist churches in Montana
1912 establishments in Montana
Churches on the National Register of Historic Places in Montana